Sianożęty  is a village in the administrative district of Gmina Ustronie Morskie, within Kołobrzeg County, West Pomeranian Voivodeship, in north-western Poland.

The village has a population of 280.

It is also a popular summer destination due to its coastal location featuring beautiful sandy beaches and a sea-side promenade.

References

Villages in Kołobrzeg County